The long-tailed ground squirrel or Eversmann's souslik (Urocitellus undulatus) is a species of rodent in the squirrel family Sciuridae. It is found in China, Kazakhstan, Mongolia, and Russia.

Description
The long-tailed ground squirrel has a compact, low-slung body, short legs and a long bushy tail. The back is brown with a linear pattern of dark, small spots. The underparts are a paler ochre-brown with a reddish tinge along the side. The tail is barred in brown and black with a prominent light edge stripe and a pale tip.

Distribution and range
There are two isolated populations in Eastern Siberia, one in southeastern Yakutia and the other in the south of the Amur region. It also occurs in Mongolia and in the northwestern and northeastern parts of China.

Behavior
The long-tailed ground squirrel lives in colonies with a labyrinth of burrows. The animals awake from hibernation in March and the young are born about a month later. There are usually five to eight young in a brood. Activity is concentrated in the early morning and then again in the afternoon and evening, the animals retiring to their burrows in the middle of the day. The diet consists of green vegetation, seeds, insects, bulbs and roots.

References

External links

Urocitellus
Rodents of China
Fauna of Kazakhstan
Mammals of Mongolia
Mammals of Russia
Mammals described in 1778
Taxa named by Peter Simon Pallas
Taxonomy articles created by Polbot